Carrillo is a small lunar impact crater located near the eastern limb of the Moon. In this location the crater is subject to lunar libration effects, and appears highly oval due to foreshortening.  It is located on the slope of highlands on the west side of Mare Smythii, and its inner wall is wider on the western side than to the east.

References

 
 
 
 
 
 
 
 
 
 
 
 

Impact craters on the Moon